The Barcelona Open (currently sponsored by Banc Sabadell) is an annual tennis tournament for male professional players. The event has been held in Barcelona, Spain every year from 1953 (except for its cancellation in 2020), and is played on clay courts at the Real Club de Tenis Barcelona.

It was an event of the Grand Prix tennis circuit from 1970–1989, except in 1971 when it was part of the World Championship Tennis (WCT) circuit, although it was also open to non-WCT players. The tournament is currently part of the ATP Tour 500 series on the ATP Tour. It is also known as Torneo Godó, Trofeo Conde de Godó, and Open Banc Sabadell.

Native Spaniard Rafael Nadal has won the singles title a record twelve times (2005, 2006, 2007, 2008, 2009, 2011, 2012, 2013, 2016, 2017, 2018, and 2021), and in 2017 the center court of the Real Club de Tenis Barcelona was renamed Pista Rafa Nadal (Rafa Nadal Arena).

Past finals

Singles

Doubles

Seniors

Statistics

Most singles titles 
 Rafael Nadal: 12 (2005–2009, 2011–2013, 2016–2018 and 2021)

Most singles finals 
 Rafael Nadal: 12

Most matches played 
 Rafael Nadal: 70

Most matches won 
 Rafael Nadal: 66

Most matches won % 
 Rafael Nadal: 94.3%

Most Appearances 
 Feliciano López: 21 (1998, 2001–2012, 2014–2019, 2021 and 2022)

Winner of most doubles titles 
 Roy Emerson: 7 (1959, 1960 and 1962 w/Fraser; 1963 w/Santana; 1964 w/Fletcher; 1965 w/Krishnan; and 1966 w/Stolle)

Doubles teams winners of most titles 
 Roy Emerson / Neale Fraser: 3 (1959, 1960 and 1962)
 Anders Järryd / Hans Simonsson: 3 (1981–1983)
 Bob Bryan / Mike Bryan: 3 (2003, 2008 and 2016)

Winners of both singles and doubles titles in the same year 
 Vic Seixas: 1953
 Tony Trabert: 1954
 Neale Fraser: 1959
 Roy Emerson: 1963 and 1964
 Manuel Orantes: 1969 and 1970
 Ilie Năstase: 1973 and 1974
 Björn Borg: 1975
 Ivan Lendl: 1980
 Andrés Gómez: 1990

See also
List of tennis tournaments

References

External links

 Official website
 ATP tournament profile

 
Tennis tournaments in Spain
Clay court tennis tournaments
Recurring sporting events established in 1953
Tennis tournaments in Barcelona
ATP Tour 500
1953 establishments in Catalonia